MonRoi, Inc. is a Montreal-based company that created a system to allow the recording of chess games in an electronic format.  The system also allows for games to be broadcast via MonRoi's World Databank of Chess in realtime, as the games are being played.

MonRoi is one of five electronic scorekeeping devices that are approved for use during USCF rated games.  The other four are the DGT Electronic Chessboard the eNotate computer program running on a Windows Mobile PDA, Plycounter, and ChessNoteR which uses the Android operating system and repurposes a Motorola Nexus 6 device to deliver its software.

The MonRoi system uses the Personal Chess Manager (PCM) to input moves on an electronic screen, similar to PDA's, rather than using the paper score sheet to record moves. The PCM stores the games for future retrieval or for downloading to a computer via a memory card. The system also allows for the Professional Tournament Manager (PTM) to be connected to a computer, allowing chess arbiters and organizers to monitor all the devices, collect the games for publication and to broadcast hundreds of games simultaneously on the Internet.

The MonRoi system has been approved for use by FIDE, the European Chess Union and the United States Chess Federation.

The MonRoi system was invented and patented by Brana Malobabic-Giancristofaro, an electrical engineer whose credentials include developing new technologies at Nortel Networks.

MonRoi, Inc. launched the first MonRoi International Women's Grand Prix, recognizing women in chess. The company collaborated with the European Chess Union, the Continental Chess Association, the Quebec Chess Federation, the Chess'n Math Association, the Susan Polgar Foundation and the Association of Chess Professionals. The Grand-Prix Finale was an eight-player round robin format tournament held in Montreal in July 2007. The host countries for the qualification events included Canada, Croatia, France, Germany, Gibraltar, Italy, Liechtenstein, and the USA.

References

External links
 MonRoi, Inc. Website
 Monroi Personal Chess Manager User Guide
 Canadian Patent CA 2512046: System and devices for real-time electronic chess move recording, viewing and storage
 Sharp Microelectronics System Solution Chosen for MonRoi Portable Chess Manager Design

Chess notation